was a ceremony undergone by apprentice  and some  (apprentice geisha) as part of their coming of age ceremony and graduation.

For , who had often already lost their virginity, a patron would pay for the exclusive privilege of being a new 's first customer; for  who underwent , it formed part of a number of ceremonies and occasions used to mark graduation into geishahood, including symbolic changes in hairstyle and official visits to benefactors.

, and courtesans as an extension, exist in a wholly non-sexual capacity in modern-day Japan;  re-enactment parades are performed by actors, and  perform their profession's traditional arts without the inclusion of sex work.

History
Through this sponsorship of the apprentice, a patron would essentially purchase the right to take the 's virginity. The  patron would often have no further relations with the young woman in question.

In the modern day,  is a contentious issue, both within the geisha communities of Japan and elsewhere. The practice was outlawed following the introduction of the Anti-Prostitution Law in 1956, categorised under the "traffic in human flesh".

Post-1956 to present day
Describing her experience of graduation to geishahood with the term , Iwasaki described her experience as a round of formal visits to announce her graduation, including the presentation of gifts to related geisha houses and important patrons, and a cycle through five different hairstyles before graduating.

Dalby relays the change between pre- and post-1956 attitudes to  within the geisha community through her first-hand accounts with the geisha mothers of Ponto-chō:

In literature 
Arthur Golden's novel Memoirs of a Geisha portrays  as a financial arrangement in which a girl's virginity is sold to a " patron", generally someone who particularly enjoys sex with virgin girls, or merely enjoys the charms of an individual .

Former geisha Sayo Masuda describes  in her 1956 autobiography Autobiography of a Geisha as sexual exploitation. Masuda describes being sold multiple times by her  to men, ostensibly for the purposes of taking her virginity, under the pretence that she had not yet lost it. The transaction was explicitly a sexual arrangement, far removed from the ceremony of graduating into geishahood, netting the  a large profit. Despite her personal experiences, Masuda argued against the outlawing of sex work in Japan, explaining that it provided a way for women to make an independent living when chosen as a profession, and through criminalisation, would merely be driven underground.

See also
 Virginity auction

References

External links

 Remaking a memoir – A new autobiography, former geisha Mineko Iwasaki

Geisha
Japanese culture
Rites of passage
Sexual abstinence
Japanese words and phrases